Night Express (French: Rapide de nuit) is a 1948 French crime drama film directed by Marcel Blistène and starring Roger Pigaut, Sophie Desmarets and Paul Demange.

The film's sets were designed by the art director Jacques Colombier.

Synopsis
A woman tricks an apparently naïve young man into carrying a suitcase full of stolen goods into a railway station. The young man substitutes the case for another, however, to avoid being an accomplice.

Cast
 Roger Pigaut as Robert
 Sophie Desmarets as Simone
 Paul Demange as M. Grand
 Jean Brochard as L'inspecteur Verdier	
 Jane Marken as Mme Louis
 Maurice Teynac as Georges Sommer
 Michel Ardan as Un des deux complices
 Paul Azaïs as Un inspecteur
 Hélène Dassonville as La caissière
 Louis Florencie as Le garçon 
 Gabrielle Fontan as La mère aux chats
 Jean Gaven as Un des deux complices
 Henry Murray as Le directeur

References

Bibliography 
 Bessy, Maurice & Chirat, Raymond. ''Histoire du cinéma français: encyclopédie des films, 1940–1950. Pygmalion, 1986

External links 
 

1948 films
1948 drama films
French drama films
1940s French-language films
French black-and-white films
Films directed by Marcel Blistène
1940s French films

fr:Rapide de nuit